Di Livio Jungschleger (born 7 July 1997) is a Dutch professional footballer who plays for Belgian club Schoonbeek Beverst as a striker.

Career
In the summer 2019, Jungschleger joined Belgian club Spouwen Mopertingen.

References

1997 births
Living people
Dutch footballers
Dutch expatriate footballers
MVV Maastricht players
Eerste Divisie players
Association football forwards
Dutch expatriate sportspeople in Belgium
Expatriate footballers in Belgium
Footballers from Maastricht